Expedition 3 was the third expedition to the International Space Station. Commander Frank L. Culbertson Jr. was the only American crew member, and as such the only American not on Earth during the 9/11 attacks, which the crew photographed and videoed from the ISS.

Crew

Mission objectives 

Research in space begun by two previous crews aboard the International Space Station (ISS) expanded during the Expedition Three mission. The third resident crew launched on 10 August 2001 on Space Shuttle Discovery during mission STS-105 and took control of the complex on 13 August 2001. The crew conducted a science-intensive increment and completed four spacewalks. The Expedition Three crew ended their 117-day residency on board the ISS on 8 December 2001 when their custom Soyuz seat-liners were transferred to Space Shuttle Endeavour for the return trip home during mission STS-108.

The Expedition Three crew of the International Space Station enjoyed a unique view of the 2001 Leonid meteor storm. "It looked like we were seeing UFOs approaching the earth flying in formation, three or four at a time," recalls astronaut Frank Culbertson. "There were hundreds per minute going beneath us, really spectacular!" News reports had warned sky watchers in advance: On 18 November 2001, Earth was due to plow through a minefield of debris shed by Comet Tempel-Tuttle. Experts predicted an unforgettable display ... and it came. Millions of people saw the show, but only three of them—the ones on board the space station—saw it from above. "We had to look down to see the meteors," says Culbertson. "That's because the atmosphere (where comet dust burns up) is below the station."

An international crew of three were the third crew to live aboard the International Space Station. The team was led by American Commander Frank Culbertson, and joined by Russian crewmates Vladimir Dezhurov, mission pilot, and flight engineer Mikhail Tyurin. As a part of the STS-105 mission, Discovery delivered the Expedition 3 crew to the station. During their four-month stay, the crew saw the orbital complex expand and research work grow. The Expedition 3 crew returned home on mission STS-108.

Spacewalks
All four of the spacewalks during Expedition 3 were completed using the Russian Orlan spacesuit and from the Pirs air lock on the Russian segment of the International Space Station.

Mission patch 
The Expedition 3 mission patch depicts the book of space history, turning from the chapter with the Russian space station Mir and the space shuttle to the next chapter, one that will be written on the blank pages of the future by space explorers working for the benefit of the entire world. Above the book is a layout of what the station will look like when completed, docked with the space shuttle.

9/11 satellite pictures

On September 11, 2001, the International Space Station passed over New York City and astronaut Frank L. Culbertson Jr. photographed the smoke clouds billowing from the World Trade Center site in Downtown Manhattan.

References

External links

 Expedition 3 Photography

Expedition 03
2001 in spaceflight